Dubourg or du Bourg is a French surname. Notable people with the name include:

Anne du Bourg (1521–1559), French lawyer
Auguste-René-Marie Dubourg (1842–1921), French cardinal of the Roman Catholic Church
Bernard Dubourg (1945–1992), French poet, professor of philosophy, translator and Hebrew scholar
Colonel du Bourg, false name of the man who set up the 1814 London stock exchange fraud
Éléonor Marie du Maine du Bourg (1655–1739), French nobleman and general
Emmanuel Dubourg (born 1958), Canadian politician, accountant and teacher
George Dubourg (1799–1882), British writer on the violin and song writer
Jacques Barbeu-Dubourg (1709–1779), French botanist and translator
Jean-Baptiste Dubourg (born 1987), French racing driver
Jean-Baptiste Miroudot du Bourg (1722–1798), French bishop
Louis Fabricius Dubourg (1693–1775), Dutch painter and engraver
Louis-Guillaume-Valentin Dubourg (1766–1833), French missionary bishop
Matthew Dubourg (1707–1767), British composer, violinist and concert-master
Victoria Dubourg (1840–1926), French painter

See also
Bishop DuBourg High School, a private Roman Catholic school in St. Louis, Missouri, US
Bourg (disambiguation)
Burgh (disambiguation)